Aurora Peak is a summit in Olympic National Park in Clallam County, Washington. It 
is the highest point on Aurora Ridge. The northern flank of the ridge forms a steep escarpment above Lake Crescent, while the southern flank towers above the Sol Duc River. Other summits on the ridge are Sourdough Mountain and Lizard Head Peak. To the east the ridge is known as Happy Lake Ridge.

The Aurora Ridge Trail follows along the ridge line providing scenic views. The Park Service notes that "some sections of this trail are difficult to follow.".

References

External links
 
 

Mountains of Clallam County, Washington
Mountains of Washington (state)
Ridges of Washington (state)